De Wit or de Wit is a surname of Dutch origin meaning "the white (one)", thought to be generally a reference to blond hair. In 2007, 24,904 people had this name in Netherlands alone, making it the 21st most common name in that country. Variant forms are De With (pronounced the same), De Witt, De Witte and, especially in North America, DeWitt. People with the name include:

Bernard de Wit (born 1945), Dutch theoretical physicist
Caitlin De Wit (born 1987), Australian wheelchair basketball player
Dani de Wit (born 1998), Dutch footballer
Emmie de Wit, Dutch-American virologist
Frank de Wit (born 1996), Dutch judoka
Frederik de Wit (1630–1706), Dutch engraver, cartographer, and publisher
Han F. de Wit (born 1944), Dutch psychologist
Hans de Wit (born 1950), Dutch educator
Hendrik de Wit (1909–1999), Dutch botanist
Jacob de Wit (1695–1754), Dutch painter
Jan de Wit (born 1945), Dutch lawyer and politician
Johan de Wit, redirect to Johan de Witt (1625–1672), Dutch grand pensionary
Johan de Wit (poet) (born 1944), Dutch-born British poet
John de Wit (born 1947), English Anglican Archdeacon
 (born 1976), Dutch badminton player
 (1924–1993), Dutch soil scientist and plant breeder
Lara de Wit (born 1983), Australian pianist, violinist, and composer
Maarten de Wit (1883–1955), Dutch Olympic sailor, son of Simon de Wit
Mees de Wit (born 1998), Dutch footballer
Michaël Dudok de Wit (born 1953), Dutch animator, film director, and illustrator
 (1852–1925), Dutch editor and collector of musical instruments
Peter de Wit (born 1958), Dutch comics artist and cartoonist
Pierre de Wit (born 1987), German footballer
Piet de Wit (born 1946), Dutch cyclist
Rob de Wit (athlete) (born 1962), Dutch  decathlete and bobsledder
Rob de Wit (footballer) (born 1963), Dutch footballer
Robert de Wit (born 1962), Dutch Olympic decathlete
Roel de Wit (1927–2012), Dutch politician and conservationist
Safira de Wit (born c. 1989), Curaçao model
Santiago de Wit Guzmán (born 1964), Spanish bishop and diplomat
Sem de Wit (born 1995), Dutch footballer
Simon de Wit (1852–1934), Dutch founder of eponymous supermarket chain
Simon de Wit (rower) (1912–1976), Dutch businessman and rower, son of Maarten
Sophie De Wit (born 1973), Belgian politician
Stephan de Wit (born 1992), South African rugby player
Tineke Duyvené de Wit (born 1946), Dutch novelist
Yannick de Wit (born 1986), Dutch footballer

deWit, DeWit, Dewit
Jacqueline deWit (1912–1998), American film and TV character actress
Jeff DeWit (born 1972/1973), American businessman and Arizona politician
Mark Dewit (born 1986), Canadian football player
Willie deWit (born 1961), Canadian lawyer and former boxer

de With
Gerard Frederikszoon de With (fl. 1625), Dutch governor of Formosa
Witte Corneliszoon de With (1599–1658), Dutch admiral

See also
 DeWitt (name)
 De Witt (surname)
 DeWitt (disambiguation)

References

Dutch-language surnames